Railway operations in Bosnia and Herzegovina are successors of the Yugoslav Railways within the country boundaries following independence from Yugoslavia in March 1992.

Overview
The two companies operating services (in their respective divisions following the Dayton Agreement) are:
Republika Srpska Railways (ŽRS), which operates in Republika Srpska
Railways of the Federation of Bosnia and Herzegovina (ŽFBH), which operates in the Federation of Bosnia and Herzegovina.

Railways of the Federation of Bosnia and Herzegovina and Railways of Republika Srpska have been members of International Union of Railways (UIC) since 1992 and 1998, respectively. They were assigned separate UIC Country Code, 44 for the  Republika Srpska and 50 for the Federation of Bosnia and Herzegovina. The new code for Bosnia and Herzegovina is 49.

See also
Narrow-gauge railways in Bosnia and Herzegovina
Sarajevo Tramway
Transport in Bosnia and Herzegovina

External links 
ŽRS - Railways of Republika Srpska
ŽFBH - Railways of the Federation of Bosnia and Herzegovina
 Timetable of train in B&H 
Bosnian passenger trains - photo gallery